Phylloxerina is a genus of true bugs belonging to the family Phylloxeridae.

The species of this genus are found in Northern America.

Species:
 Phylloxerina capreae Börner, 1942 
 Phylloxerina daphnoidis Iglisch, 1965

References

Phylloxeridae